The 118th Independent Brigade of the Territorial Defense Forces is a military formation of the Territorial Defense Forces of Ukraine in Cherkasy Oblast. It is part of Operational Command North.

History

Formation 
On 7 November 2018 the brigade was formed in Cherkasy Oblast. It was created on the basis of the already excising battalion from Cherkasy. Creation process took 3-4 month. Colonel Stuzhenko Anatolii was appointed as its commander. The brigade was planned to be composed of about 4,000 older reservists, aged 40–60 year old. Brigade included 6 battalions stationed in Smila, Zolotonosha, Uman, Zhashkiv, Zvenyhorodka and Cherkasy.

From 5 to 11 August 2019 brigade held large scale exercise involving headquarters and all 6 battalions. Troops learned tactical medicine, engineering training, the basics of topography and communications and firing drills.

On 2 February 2022 commander Colonel Stuzhenko Anatolii, informed that Brigade was 70% formed.

Russo-Ukrainian War

2022 Russian invasion of Ukraine
During first week of March, 2 battalions were fully fully staffed with reservists. In April, one battalion of the brigade took part in Battle of Popasna, where they helped with defense of the city for 14 days. Brigade was awarded its Battle flag on 14 October.

157th Territorial Defense Battalion from Zolotonosha performed its direct role in territory of Cherkasy Oblast. Later it was sent to strengthen neighboring Poltava Oblast. Unit also fought in Battle of Bakhmut and in February 2023 it was fighting in Battle of Vuhledar.

In January 2023 Units of the brigade were fighting in Battle of Vuhledar.

Structure 
As of 2022 the brigade's structure is as follows:
 Headquarters
 156th Territorial Defense Battalion (Cherkasy) А7322
 157th Territorial Defense Battalion (Zolotonosha) А7323
 158th Territorial Defense Battalion (Smila) А7324
 159th Territorial Defense Battalion (Zvenyhorodka) А7325
 160th Territorial Defense Battalion (Uman) А7326
 161th Territorial Defense Battalion (Zhashkiv) А7327
 Counter-Sabotage Company
 Engineering Company
 Communication Company
 Logistics Company
 Mortar Battery

Commanders 
 Colonel Stuzhenko Anatolii 2018–present

See also 
 Territorial Defense Forces of the Armed Forces of Ukraine

References 

Territorial defense Brigades of Ukraine
2018 establishments in Ukraine
Military units and formations established in 2018